Elin Maria Pernilla Nordegren (formerly Woods; born 1 January 1980) is the Swedish-born ex-wife of professional golfer Tiger Woods. Nordegren has worked as a model and nanny.

Early life and education 
Nordegren was born in Stockholm. Her mother, politician Barbro Holmberg, is the former Swedish migration and asylum policy minister as well as the former Governor of Gävleborg County. Her father, Thomas Nordegren, is a radio journalist who has served as a bureau chief in Washington, D.C. She has an elder brother, Axel, and a twin sister Josefin Nordegren. Nordegren and her sister had summer jobs as cashiers in supermarkets to finance their studies. Elin started modeling in 2000, and appeared on the cover of Cafe Sport magazine in the summer of 2000.

In May 2014, Nordegren graduated from Rollins College in Winter Park, Florida, with a degree in psychology, receiving the outstanding senior award.

Personal life

Marriage and family 
Nordegren took a job in Champagne, a Stockholm clothing store, where she met Mia Parnevik, wife of Swedish golfer Jesper Parnevik, who hired Nordegren as the au pair to their children, the job requiring her to move full-time to the U.S. Tiger Woods was introduced to her during the 2001 Open Championship. For the previous year, Woods had asked to be introduced to Nordegren, who was seeing someone else at the time. "She had no interest in Tiger and he was OK with that," Mia Parnevik said. "There was a big line of single golfers wanting to meet her. They were gaga over her." At the time, she had hopes of becoming a child psychologist. In November 2003, Woods and Nordegren attended the Presidents Cup tournament in South Africa and became officially engaged when Woods proposed at the luxury Shamwari Game Reserve.

They were married in October 2004, by the 19th hole of the Sandy Lane resort in Barbados. Woods rented the entire complex for a week, including three golf courses and 110 rooms, costing almost 

Nude photographs purporting to be of Nordegren began circulating on the Internet. Despite them being fakes, Irish magazine The Dubliner published the nude photographs and stated they were of Nordegren. On 16 November 2006, Nordegren filed a libel suit against The Dubliner. Nordegren won €125,000, and The Dubliner was required to publish a lengthy apology in a variety of venues.

In 2007, Woods announced the birth of the couple's daughter, Sam Alexis, a day after finishing second in the U.S. Open. On 2 September 2008, Woods announced they were expecting another child in late winter. Nordegren gave birth to a boy, Charlie Axel, in 2009.

Divorce 
In December 2009, her marriage to Woods was the subject of extensive media coverage after Woods admitted to infidelity, which had been revealed following his single-vehicle accident near the family's Florida home.  After Woods' infidelity was revealed, Jesper Parnevik was quoted as having said, "I'm kind of filled with sorrow for Elin since me and my wife are at fault for hooking her up with him, and we probably thought he was a better guy than he is." Woods announced he would take an "indefinite break" from golf to work on his marriage. These efforts were unsuccessful, however, as Nordegren and Woods finalized their divorce in the Bay County Circuit Court in Panama City, Florida, on 23 August 2010. Nordegren's legal team included her sister, Josefin (who is licensed to practice law in England and Sweden) and several of Josefin's U.S. colleagues at international law firm McGuireWoods.

Using the $100 million she received from her divorce from Woods, she purchased a $12 million Florida mansion built in the 1920s. She had the entire structure demolished after an architect advised that it made better sense to start over than to try bringing the home up to current hurricane safety codes. Before demolishing the home in December 2011, she allowed Habitat for Humanity to come into the home for four weeks and salvage anything they found of value. The contents of the estate were auctioned at a Habitat for Humanity warehouse, including a  fountain with water spouting out of three lions' mouths, five refrigerators, temperature-controlled wine coolers, and other furniture.

After divorce from Woods 
Nordegren also had a relationship with coal mogul and philanthropist Chris Cline.

In June 2019, it was announced that Nordegren was expecting her third child, her first with former National Football League player Jordan Cameron. Nordegren gave birth to a son in October 2019.

In September 2020, Nordegren sold her Palm Beach home for $28.6 million.

In December 2022, Nordegren gave birth to a son.

References 

Identical twins
People from Stockholm
Rollins College alumni
Swedish expatriates in the United States
Swedish female models
Swedish twins
1980 births
Living people